Leptapha is a genus of horse flies in the family Tabanidae.

Distribution
Brazil.

Species
Leptapha fumata (Wiedemann, 1821)

References

Tabanidae
Diptera of South America
Taxa named by Günther Enderlein
Brachycera genera